Davies House, also known as "Twin Spruce," is a historic home located in Ontelaunee Township, Berks County, Pennsylvania.   It was built between 1767 and 1772, and is a -story, fieldstone dwelling with a gable roof. It has a two-story, stone and frame addition to the west, with a one-story half gable addition on that. The additions were completed by 1835.  It is Georgian in style with Federal style details.  Also on the property is a contributing stone smokehouse / cold cellar.

It was listed on the National Register of Historic Places in 1982.

References

Houses on the National Register of Historic Places in Pennsylvania
Georgian architecture in Pennsylvania
Houses completed in 1772
Houses in Berks County, Pennsylvania
1772 establishments in Pennsylvania
National Register of Historic Places in Berks County, Pennsylvania